Lucky Dharmasena also known as Lucky Alagoda (born around 1945) is a Sri Lankan former badminton player. Lucky Dharmasena is a former national badminton champion who is also regarded as one of the greatest female badminton players to have represented the country both at national and international levels.

She was a national champion at the  Sri Lankan National Badminton Championships on 6 occasions in the women's singles category (1964, 1965, 1966, 1967, 1968, 1970). She also won the women's doubles at the Badminton National Championships on 4 times in 1965, 1967, 1968 and 1970.

After a prolific badminton career, she went onto coach the Sri Lankan national badminton team from 1982-1988. Especially, she coached the national team at the 1986 Asian Games which was held in Hyderabad.

Lucky then went onto participate at the  World Masters Games in 2002 which was held in Melbourne, competing in the over-55 category. She secured the gold medal in the women's badminton singles event and also won the silver medal in the women's doubles event along with her partner Hilda Kreulitch of Austria. Lucky Dharmasena also went onto clinch the silver medal in the mixed doubles event partnering Dhammika Guneratne.

She currently lives in England with her family since 1970.

References

External links 
Past national badminton winners

Living people
Sri Lankan female badminton players
English people of Sri Lankan descent
Year of birth missing (living people)